The Mark 6 nuclear bomb was an American nuclear bomb based on the earlier Mark 4 nuclear bomb and its predecessor, the Mark 3 Fat Man nuclear bomb design.

The Mark 6 was in production from 1951 to 1955 and saw service until 1962.  Seven variants and versions were produced, with a total production run of all models of 1100 bombs.

Early models of the Mark 6 used the same 32-point implosion system design concept as the earlier Mark 4 and Mark 3; the Mark 6 Mod 2 and later used a different, 60-point implosion system.

Various models and pit options gave nuclear yields of 18, 26, 80, 154, and 160 kilotons for Mark 6 models.

Survivors 
There are several Mark 6 casings on display:
 Defense Nuclear Weapons School on Kirtland Air Force Base in Albuquerque, New Mexico
 Cold War Gallery of the National Museum of the United States Air Force in Dayton, Ohio
 Museum of Aviation (Warner Robins) in Warner Robins, Georgia
 Hill Aerospace Museum in Ogden, Utah

Variants

Mark 13
The Mark 13 nuclear bomb and W13 missile warhead were developed as higher-efficiency Mark 6 successors, the same size and basic configuration as the Mark 6 but utilizing an improved 92-point implosion system. The Mark 13 was cancelled in August 1954 and the W13 cancelled September 1954, in both cases without ever seeing production service.

Mark 18
The Mark 18 nuclear bomb was a follow-on to the Mark 6 and Mark 13, utilizing a fissile pit assembly with around 60 kilograms of HEU and delivering a yield of 500 kilotons, the largest pure-fission (non-thermonuclear) bomb design ever developed by the US.  Mark 18 bombs were eventually recycled into Mark 6 Mod 6 bombs after thermonuclear weapons were deployed in quantity.  The Mark 18 was tested once in Operation Ivy King.

XM1 Atomic Demolition Munition

An Atomic Demolition Munition, the XM1 was developed. Few details on the system exist.

See also
List of nuclear weapons
1958 Mars Bluff B-47 nuclear weapon loss incident

References

External links

Allbombs.html list of all US nuclear warheads at nuclearweaponarchive.org

Mark 06
Nuclear bombs of the United States
Military equipment introduced in the 1950s